Bulltofta is a neighbourhood of Malmö, Sweden. It contains the defunct Malmö Bulltofta Airport.

References

Neighbourhoods of Malmö